Christopher Marples (born 3 August 1964 in Chesterfield, Derbyshire) is an English former footballer and first-class cricketer.

Football career
Marples' Football League goalkeeping career spanned 1984 to 1995, beginning and ending with his local club, Chesterfield and also taking in spells with York City and Stockport County. He won a Fourth Division Championship medal in his first season with Chesterfield and was part of the club's 1994–95 squad that again won promotion from the fourth tier, this time via the playoffs. However, he broke his leg in two places during the course of the campaign.

Though this injury ended his career at the top level, he continued to play non-league football for several years, including with Emley and Ilkeston Town who he went on to manage for the 2001–02 season before a run of poor results led to his dismissal.

In 2005, he became assistant manager to Nicky Law at Buxton during a period which brought success for the club with the achievement of two consecutive promotions in the 2005–06 and 2006–07 seasons to reach the Northern Premier League Premier Division. He accompanied Law in a switch to Alfreton Town for the following season  but resigned in April 2008 citing other commitments.

Cricket career
In cricket, Marples was a wicket-keeper and right-handed batsman. Having represented the Derbyshire team in the Second XI Championship as early as 1982, Marples made his debut County Championship appearance in July 1985 against Yorkshire. He finished the game with four catches and played all ten subsequent fixtures in the competition to the end of the season. In addition, Marples was part of Derbyshire's Asda Challenge Trophy winning side.

He played fifteen further First-class cricket matches for the club in 1986, a season during which Derbyshire used three different players in the wicket-keeper role, with Bernie Maher, who was recognised as a stronger batsman, eventually reclaiming the position. Marples was not offered a new contract thereafter.

However, Marples stayed on to play several games with the Second XI in 1987, and returned to play one Second XI game in 1993, an almost actionless three-day match, against Leicestershire.

Throughout the two seasons in which he was a first-team player, Marples was a tail-end batsman alongside Danish mainstay Ole Mortensen and was often unlucky to find himself out of action as a strike partner.

Honours
Individual
PFA Team of the Year: 1989–90 Fourth Division

References

External links

Chris Marples at Cricket Archive

1964 births
Living people
Cricketers from Chesterfield, Derbyshire
English footballers
Association football goalkeepers
Goole Town F.C. players
Chesterfield F.C. players
Stockport County F.C. players
York City F.C. players
Scunthorpe United F.C. players
English Football League players
Wakefield F.C. players
Ilkeston Town F.C. (1945) players
Ilkeston Town F.C. managers
English cricketers
Derbyshire cricketers
Derbyshire Cricket Board cricketers
English football managers